Roti (Punjabi) is a 1988 Pakistani action film.

Directed by M. Idrees Khan and produced by Abdul Waheed. The film is starring Sultan Rahi, Anjuman, Mustafa Qureshi, and Humayun Qureshi.

Cast

 Anjuman love interest of Karma
 Sultan Rahi as Karma
 Saiqa as sister of Karma
 Talish
 Mustafa Qureshi as Javed Supera
 Zumurrud as Supera's lover
 Abid Ali
 Tanzeem Hassan
 Bahar
 Deeba as mother of Karma
 Albela
 Mansoor Baloch as Karamdad
 Humayun Qureshi as Bataa
 Tariq Shah as Hibbiat khan
 Sawan as Haq Baig
 Munir Zarif

Track list
The soundtrack was composed by musician Wajahat Attre, with lyrics by Waris Ludhyanvi and sung by Noor Jehan, and Mehnaz, Ghulam Abbas, Masood Rana.

References

1980s political films
Pakistani biographical films
Pakistani political films
Pakistani crime action films
1988 films
Punjabi-language Pakistani films
1980s crime action films
1980s Punjabi-language films